The Women's keirin at the 2012 UCI Track Cycling World Championships was held on April 7. 22 athletes participated in the contest. After the 4 qualifying heats, the 2 fastest rider in each heat advanced to the second round. The riders that did not advance to the second round raced in 4 repechage heats. The first rider in each heat advanced to the second round along with the 8 that qualified before.

The first 3 riders from each of the 2 Second Round heats advanced to the Final and the remaining riders raced a consolation 7–12 final.

Medalists

Results

First round
The first round was held at 14:15.

Heat 1

Heat 2

Heat 3

Heat 4

First Round Repechage
The first round repechage was held at 15:40.

Heat 1

Heat 2

Heat 3

Heat 4

Second round
The second round was held at 19:30.

Heat 1

Heat 2

Finals
The finals were held at 20:20.

Small Final

Final

References

2012 UCI Track Cycling World Championships
UCI Track Cycling World Championships – Women's keirin